is a JR West Kabe Line station located in Midorii, Asaminami-ku, Hiroshima, Hiroshima Prefecture, Japan.

Station layout
Shichikenjaya Station features one side platform handling one bidirectional track. The station is unmanned, and contains an automatic ticket machine.

Platforms

History
1910-12-18: Shichikenjaya Station opens
1987-04-01: Japanese National Railways is privatized, and Shichikenjaya Station becomes a JR West station
2008-03-18: Platform extended to allow 4 car trains to stop

Surrounding area
 Japan National Route 54
Midorii Post Office
Asaminami-ku Satō Branch Office
Midorii Waste Water Treatment Plant
Hiroshima Jōnan Junior High School

External links
 JR West

Kabe Line
Hiroshima City Network
Stations of West Japan Railway Company in Hiroshima city
Railway stations in Japan opened in 1910